Jacobus Lorenz (22 December 1884 – 17 January 1969) was a Dutch wrestler. He competed in the men's Greco-Roman middleweight at the 1908 Summer Olympics.

References

1884 births
1969 deaths
Dutch male sport wrestlers
Olympic wrestlers of the Netherlands
Wrestlers at the 1908 Summer Olympics
Sportspeople from Amsterdam